The 2023 Sigerson Cup was the 110th staging of the Sigerson Cup since its establishment by the Gaelic Athletic Association in 1910. It was sponsored by Electric Ireland, and known as the Electric Ireland HE GAA Sigerson Cup for sponsorship purposes. The draw for the group stage fixtures took place on 14 December 2022. The cup ran from 10 January to 16 February 2023.

University of Galway entered the Sigerson Cup as the defending champions, however, they were beaten by University of Limerick in the quarter-finals.

The Sigerson Cup final was played on 15 February 2023 at the SETU Waterford Complex, between UNiversity College Cork and University of Limerick, in what was their first ever meeting in the final. University College Cork won the match by 1-16 to 0-16 to claim their 24th Sigerson Cup title overall and a first title in four years.

University College Dublin's David Garland was the top scorer with 5-20.

Results

Round 1

Round 2A

Round 2B

Round 3

Quarter-finals

Semi-finals

Final

Statistics

Top scorers

Overall

In a single game

References

External link
 Higher Education fixtures and results

Fitzgibbon
Sigerson Cup